A Fine Day to Exit is the sixth album by the British rock band Anathema. It was released on 9 October 2001 through Music for Nations.

This is the only occasion where an Anathema album has John Douglas credited as a writer for around half of the songs. He wrote "Pressure", "Looking Outside Inside", "Panic" (co-written with Daniel Cavanagh), the title track and the hidden acoustic track at the end of "Temporary Peace" called "In the Dog's House".

It is the last album with bassist Dave Pybus, and the first with keyboardist Les Smith.

Track listing

* Credited to only John Douglas on initial release; reissues credit Douglas, V. Cavanagh, D. Cavanagh, D. Pybus, L. Smith 
† "Temporary Peace" proper fades into the sound of waves crashing and finishes at 5:40. More crashing waves follow with the sound of footsteps, voices, and piano chords beginning at 7:50 and going on until minute 10:25. That's followed by five minutes of silence; at 15:25 the acoustic hidden song "In the Dog's House" starts.

** Credited to only John Douglas on initial release
†† "Temporary Peace" proper fades into the sound of waves crashing and finishes at minute 5:40. More crashing waves until 9:46 when the sound of footsteps, voices, and piano chords begin; at 12:15 the acoustic hidden song "In the Dog's House" starts.

Personnel

 Vincent Cavanagh - vocals, guitars
 Danny Cavanagh - guitars, keyboards, backing vocals
 Les Smith - keyboards, programming
 John Douglas - drums

Additional musicians
 Dave Pybus - bass (except "Looking Outside In" and "Leave No Trace")
 Lee Douglas - vocals on "Barriers"
 Nick Griffiths, Pete Brown - backing vocals

Production
 Ewan Davies - engineering assistant
 Pete Brown - engineering
 Les Smith - engineering
 Colin Richardson - mixing
 Wil Bartle - engineering assistant
 Travis Smith - artwork
 Nick Griffiths - producer, engineering
 Martin Wilding - engineering assistant

Charts

References

2001 albums
Anathema (band) albums
Music for Nations albums